Mánfa is a village in Baranya county, Hungary.

Geography
Mánfa is situated in the Mecsek Mountains in Southern Hungary. It can be reached by car along the No. 66 highway in the Kaposvár–Sásd–Magyarszék–Pécs line.

History
The village dates to the Árpád age. In 1949, it was officially combined with another village, Budafa, and the united village was attached to the town of Komló, a mining town near Pécs. In 1991, the people of Mánfa voted to separate from Komló, again making Mánfa an independent village.

Landmarks
The Árpád age romanesque church consecrated to Our Lady (Sarlós Boldogasszony)

References

 Gerevich Tibor: Magyarország románkori emlékei. (Die romanische Denkmäler Ungarns.) Egyetemi nyomda. Budapest, 1938.

External links
 Mánfa village official homepage
 Mánfa on the Vendégváró homepage
 Aerial photographs of Mánfa

Populated places in Baranya County
Romanesque architecture in Hungary